"Kings of Speed" is a 1975 song by the British space rock group Hawkwind. It was originally released as a single in the UK (UP35808) on 7 March 1975 and was subsequently included on the album Warrior on the Edge of Time, although its B-side, "Motorhead", was not. Although failing the chart in both the U.S. and the U.K., the track became an underground success, particularly with significant play in dance clubs. The parent album also did well, climbing up the Billboard album chart in the U.S.

Kings of Speed
The lyrics for this song were written by Michael Moorcock, "Frank and Beasley" refer to characters from Moorcock's Cornelius books. Simon King stated that it was originally intended for inclusion of the Deep Fix album New Worlds Fair.

"It's very powerful - it's got two drums on it and it sounds fucking great. It's like a Phil Spector thing." - Alan Powell

Motorhead
The b-side has become one of Hawkwind's best-known songs, in large part because Lemmy, who wrote it, named his subsequent band after it. It is notable that the song title does not have an umlaut in it; that was added to the band name at a later stage. The lyrics "Sun rise wrong side of another day, sky high and six thousand miles away" are explained as:

"I was on tour with Hawkwind in 1974, we were staying at the Riot House [Hyatt Hotel in Los Angeles] and Roy Wood and Wizzard were also in town. I got this urge to write a song in the middle of the night. I ran downstairs to the Wizzard room, got Roy's Ovation acoustic guitar, then hurried back to mine. I went on to the balcony and howled away for four hours. Cars were stopping and the drivers were listening then driving off, and there I was yelling away at the top of my voice." - Lemmy, Riffs that Changed the World

Other versions
Neither song made it into the live set. It would be years until "King of Speed" would surface for a 1989 tour, while "Motorhead" has only recently been added to the band's current retro-show, with Alan Davey playing the part of Lemmy.

Outtake
The original backing tracks were taken by Brock from this Olympic Studio session, and he later added overdubs and released them through independent record companies. "Kings of Speed" was released as an instrumental (and claimed to be 'live') on the Hawkwind Zoo 12" EP (Flicknife Records, FLEP100, 1-May-1981). "Motorhead" was released as the A-side to a 7" and 12" single (Flicknife Records, FLS205, 2-July-1981), this time having a Brock vocal and synthesizer overdubs.

Covers
Motörhead released their version of "Motorhead" in 1977 as a single and on their debut Motörhead album, and a live version in 1981 as a single (reaching number 6 in the UK charts) and on the No Sleep 'til Hammersmith album.

Cover versions of "Motorhead" have been recorded by Corduroy in 1993 as a single and on their Out Of Here album, by Primal Scream on their 1997 Vanishing Point album, and by Lawnmower Deth on their 1990 album Ooh Crikey...It's Lawnmower Deth.

References

Hawkwind songs
1975 songs
Songs written by Lemmy
Songs with lyrics by Michael Moorcock

it:Motörhead (brano musicale)